Trevelin Marleto Queen (born February 25, 1997) is an American professional basketball player for the Indiana Pacers of the National Basketball Association (NBA), on a two-way contract with the Fort Wayne Mad Ants of the NBA G League. He played college basketball for the New Mexico State Aggies, as well as at College of Marin and New Mexico Military Institute.

Early life and high school career
Queen began playing basketball at the age of four at a hoop in his garage. He played shortstop and pitcher on the baseball field growing up, which he said was his best sport. Queen played football for the FAB Phenoms Amateur Athletic Union (AAU) program. He played basketball for North County High School in his hometown of Glen Burnie, Maryland. He began playing for the varsity team as a sophomore for the final playoff game of the season. Queen moved to a high school in Florida for his junior season but was not allowed to play basketball because he had transferred too late. Queen returned to North County as a senior and played nine games. He had no college basketball offers by the end of his high school career.

College career
Queen originally planned to attend Prince George's Community College due to a mutual relationship between the school's basketball coach and his AAU coach, but he redshirted his first season because of paperwork issues. He began playing college basketball at College of Marin in Marin County, California. While attending the school, Queen lived in crowded conditions at a retirement home before he and his roommates were kicked out. For one week, he lived with three teammates in a car in East Oakland, before moving into the home of his teammate's relative. Queen scored a freshman season-high 29 points, to go with 11 rebounds and eight steals, in a December 10, 2016 win over Feather River College. In 14 games with Marin, he averaged a team-high 21.3 points, 7.9 rebounds and 2.4 assists per game. 

As a sophomore, Queen moved to New Mexico Military Institute in Roswell, New Mexico upon his family's advice. In his season debut, he scored 40 points in a November 1, 2017 victory over Northern New Mexico JV. On November 4, Queen recorded a season-high 41 points in a loss to New Mexico Junior College. By the end of the season, he was averaging 26 points, which ranked fourth in the National Junior College Athletic Association, to go with 7.3 rebounds and 2.2 assists per game. Queen was selected to the All-Western Junior College Athletic Conference team. He committed to play NCAA Division I basketball for Western Kentucky and enrolled at the school but departed in September 2018. He later committed to New Mexico State.

As a junior, Queen averaged 7.8 points, 2.9 rebounds and 1.7 assists per game as one of the top reserves for the Aggies. He scored a season-high 27 points in the WAC Tournament title game against Grand Canyon. He was named the 2019 WAC Tournament MVP. In the first round of the 2019 NCAA tournament, he scored 14 points but missed a potential game-winning three-pointer in a 78–77 loss to fifth-seeded Auburn, who would advance to the Final Four. As a senior, Queen averaged 13.2 points and 5.2 rebounds per game and was one of the top defenders in the conference. He missed three weeks with a knee injury. Queen was named to the Second Team All-WAC. He scored a season-high 23 points and nine rebounds on November 22, 2019, in a 78-77 loss to New Mexico.

Professional career

Rio Grande Valley Vipers (2021)
After going undrafted in the 2020 NBA draft, Queen signed with the Houston Rockets on November 12, 2020. He was waived in training camp on December 16. He then joined the Rockets' NBA G League affiliate, the Rio Grande Valley Vipers, making his debut on February 10, 2021. Queen averaged 10 points, 2.3 rebounds, 1.2 assists and 1.2 steals per game, shooting 45.8 percent from the floor.

On September 29, 2021, Queen signed a partially guaranteed training camp deal with the Los Angeles Lakers, but was waived on October 15. Queen subsequently rejoined the Rio Grande Valley Vipers. In 10 games, he averaged 22.0 points, 6.3 rebounds, 4.1 assists, 3.0 steals and 2.6 3-pointers made.

Houston Rockets (2021–2022)
On December 18, 2021, Queen signed a two-way contract with the Houston Rockets. On April 7, 2022, he was named the 2021–22 NBA G League Most Valuable Player.

Indiana Pacers (2022–present) 
On July 1, 2022, Queen signed with the Philadelphia 76ers worth $3.5 million in a two year deal. Unfortunately, Queen was waived by the 76ers after suffering a head injury in a opening preseason game.

On October 11, 2022, Queen signed a two-way contract with the Indiana Pacers. He was named to the G League's inaugural Next Up Game for the 2022–23 season.

Career statistics

NBA

|-
| style="text-align:left;"| 
| style="text-align:left;"| Houston
| 10 || 0 || 7.4 || .455 || .375 || 1.000 || 1.6 || .4 || .5 || .1 || 4.3
|- class="sortbottom"
| style="text-align:center;" colspan="2"| Career
| 10 || 0 || 7.4 || .455 || .375 || 1.000 || 1.6 || .4 || .5 || .1 || 4.3

References

External links
New Mexico State Aggies bio

1997 births
Living people
American men's basketball players
Basketball players from Baltimore
College of Marin alumni
Houston Rockets players
Junior college men's basketball players in the United States
New Mexico Military Institute alumni
New Mexico State Aggies men's basketball players
People from Glen Burnie, Maryland
Rio Grande Valley Vipers players
Shooting guards
Sportspeople from Anne Arundel County, Maryland
Undrafted National Basketball Association players